is a Hongan-ji school Jōdo Shinshū temple on the island of Ikuchijima in Onomichi, Hiroshima Prefecture, Japan. Founded by the industrialist Koso Kōsanji in 1936 in honour of his deceased mother, and with an area of approximately fifty thousand square metres, many of its structures are modelled upon the country's most famous historic temples and shrines. The  is a monument landscaped with five thousand square metres of Carrara marble, weighing some three thousand tons, by Kazuto Kuetani. The Kōsan-ji Museum houses over two thousand items, including nineteen Important Cultural Properties.

See also
 Jōdo Shinshū

References

External links
  Kōsanji - English language site
  Kōsanji homepage

Buddhist temples in Hiroshima Prefecture
Museums in Hiroshima Prefecture
Art museums and galleries in Japan
Shinshū Honganji-ha temples